150 Milligrams (lit. The Girl of Brest) is a 2016 French drama film directed by Emmanuelle Bercot. It was screened in the Special Presentations section at the 2016 Toronto International Film Festival. The film is based on the true story of French pulmonologist , who became noted for her investigations of the serious side effects and deaths attributed to the diabetes drug Mediator, produced by French manufacturer Laboratoires Servier.

Cast
 Sidse Babett Knudsen as 
 Benoît Magimel as Antoine Le Bihan
 Charlotte Laemmel as Patoche
 Lara Neumann as Anne Jouan
  as Aubert
  as Bruno Frachon
 Olivier Pasquier as Arsène Weber
 Isabelle de Hertogh as Corinne Zacharria
 Gustave Kervern as Kermarec
 Pablo Pauly as Charles-Joseph Oudin 
 Myriam Azencot as Catherine Haynes
 Eddie Chignara as Christophe Laugier
 Raphaël Ferret as Fred
 Christophe Meynet as David
  as Yannick Jobic
 Élise Lucet as herself

Reception
The Hollywood Reporter's Leslie Felperin cited the "outsize but empathic central performance" by star Sidse Babett Knudsen in the role of Frachon and the director's ability to handle the film's "intellectually rigorous storytelling" and many characters.

Accolades

See also

List of films featuring diabetes

References

External links
 

2016 films
2016 drama films
2010s French-language films
Biographical films about physicians
Drama films based on actual events
French drama films
Films about medical malpractice
Films based on non-fiction books
Medical-themed films
Films directed by Emmanuelle Bercot
2010s French films